Elisabeth Gassner (c. 1747 – 16 July 1788), née Ebnerin, was an infamous German pickpocket, thief and prostitute, known as Schwarze Lies  (Black Lisa).

Early life and family
Gassner was born in the monastery of Wiblingen near Ulm, and was christened on 9 April 1747. She had a brother, six and a half her elder, named Martin, who entered military service at the beginning of the Seven Years' War. Her father, Johannes Ebner, was a retired soldier and came from a labouring family from Thonlohe near the Altmühl valley. He died early, allegedly in Hirschbach, Bavaria. The mother was born illegitimately in Katzdorf near Neunburg vorm Wald. She died on 26 May 1782 at the age of 77 years in Biberberg. At the time of Elisabeth's birth, her parents were living as vagrants.

On 7 June 1770, Gassner married Johannes Gassner, a native of Biberberg, who after twelve years of military service in various troop contingents of the Swabia district returned with Gassner to his hometown and settled there. The couple already had two children, Hansjörg and Kreszenzia at that time. The couple had four more children; Joseph, Mary Josepha and two others who died during childhood.

Criminal career
At the end of the 1760s, Gassner started to get involved in crime through prostitution and thief. At that time, however, she made her living primarily by knitting cotton stockings and by working in agriculture on a seasonal basis. Whilst living in Biberberg, she was increasingly forced to feed the steadily growing family, which included mother Elisabetha Ebnerin, from by theft. By the end of 1779, the Gassner household included eight people. A year earlier, Gassner had acquired their own small-scale farming estate though the proceeds of crime.

The arrest of the couple in early 1781 ended Gassner sedentary life in Biberberg. She first settled in Switzerland, then spent 6 months in the Tyrol with a new partner, Matheis Ruttmann from Oettingen in Bayern, before returning with him to Württembergische. In March 1786 the couple had a daughter in Bleibach near Gutach im Breisgau. The daughter was baptized Anna Maria. The couple lived almost exclusively off Gassner's pickpocketing. The loss caused to her victims from a total of 300 documented property offenses was later roughly estimated at 7,685 guilders.

Gassner was arrested for pickpocketing the Imperial Count, Franz Ludwig Schenk von Castell. The theft occurred in the chapel of the Ludwigsburg Palace, when gold currency to the value of 1,700 guilders was stolen. Gassner was sentenced to death for the crime.

Gassner obtained respite by stating at the end of her interrogation that she was pregnant. The investigation by three court-ordered midwives on 15 May 1788 could not confirm this, but the report advised that the execution of the required capital punishment be suspended until the end of the ninth month after the arrest.

On 16 July 1788, Elisabeth Gassner was executed by sword in Oberdischingen by executioner Xaver Vollmer.

References

Further reading
 Eva Wiebel, Die Schleiferbärbel und die schwarze Lies. Leben und Lebensbeschreibungen zweier berüchtigter Gaunerinnen des 18. Jahrhunderts, in Andreas Blauert/Gerd Schwerhoff (eds.) Kriminalitätsgeschichte Beiträge zur Sozial- und Kulturgeschichte der Vormoderne, Konstanz 2000, pp. 759–800
 Silja Foshag, "Es seye eine Forcht, was sie gestohlen ...". Leben und Persönlichkeit der 1788 zu Oberdischingen hingerichteten "Erzdiebin" und "Landvagantin" Elisabetha Gassnerin, genannt Schwarze Lies. Dissertation, Universität Potsdam, 2015.

1747 births
1788 deaths
18th-century German people
Executed German women
People executed in the Holy Roman Empire by decapitation
People from Neu-Ulm (district)
Executed people from Bavaria
German prostitutes
18th-century executions in the Holy Roman Empire